Methylobacterium iners  is a bacterium from the genus of Methylobacterium which has been isolated from an air sample in Suwon in Korea.

References

Further reading

External links
Type strain of Methylobacterium iners at BacDive -  the Bacterial Diversity Metadatabase

Hyphomicrobiales
Bacteria described in 2008